Donal J. O'Donoghue (5 June 1894 – 26 July 1971) was an Irish Fianna Fáil politician who served as a Teachta Dála (TD) for the Kerry South constituency from 1944 to 1948.

A teacher by profession, he was first elected as a Fianna Fáil TD at the 1944 by-election for the Kerry South constituency. The by-election was caused by the appointment of Fionán Lynch of Fine Gael as a judge. He was defeated at the 1948 general election.

References

1894 births
1971 deaths
Fianna Fáil TDs
Members of the 12th Dáil
Politicians from County Kerry
Irish schoolteachers